Drożęcin-Lubiejewo  is a village in the administrative district of Gmina Piątnica, within Łomża County, Podlaskie Voivodeship, in north-eastern Poland. 

The National Census of Population and Housing from 2011 states the official population of the village is 84, with 48.8% of the population being women and 51.2% of the population being male.

References

Villages in Łomża County